Aviva Chomsky (born April 20, 1957) is an American teacher, historian, author, and activist. She is a professor of history and the Coordinator of Latin American, Latino and Caribbean Studies at Salem State University in Massachusetts. She previously taught at Bates College in Maine and was a research associate at Harvard University, where she specialized in Caribbean and Latin American history.

Early life
She is the eldest daughter of linguists Noam and Carol Chomsky. Her paternal grandfather, William Chomsky (1896–1977), was a Hebrew scholar at Gratz College, where he served as principal for many years.

Career and education
Between 1976 and 1977, Chomsky worked for the United Farm Workers union. She credited this experience with sparking her "interest in the Spanish language, in migrant workers and immigration, in labor history, in social movements and labor organizing, in multinationals and their workers, in how global economic forces affect individuals, and how people collectively organize for social change". At the University of California at Berkeley, she earned a B.A. in Spanish and Portuguese in 1982, an M.A. in history in 1985, and a Ph.D. in history in 1990. She began teaching at Bates College, and became an associate professor of history at Salem State College in 1997, the Coordinator of Latin American Studies in 1999, and a full professor in 2002.

Chomsky's book West Indian Workers and the United Fruit Company in Costa Rica 1870–1940 was awarded the 1997 Best Book Prize by the New England Council of Latin American Studies. It describes the history of the United Fruit Company, formed in 1899 from the merger of multiple U.S.-based companies that built railroads and cultivated bananas on the Atlantic Coast of Costa Rica. It also shows how the workers, including many Jamaicans of African descent, developed their own parallel socioeconomic system.

Chomsky has been active in Latin American solidarity and immigrants’ rights issues since the 1980s. She is a member of the North Shore Colombia Solidarity Committee. Her articles on immigration rights have appeared in The Nation, HuffPost and TomDispatch, a project of The Nation Institute, and she has delivered lectures across the world on labor rights and immigration rights.

Publications

Books 
 Is Science Enough?: Forty Critical Questions About Climate Justice, Beacon Press, Boston Massachusetts. April 2022. 
 Central America's Forgotten History: Revolution, Violence, and the Roots of Migration, Beacon Press, Boston Massachusetts. April 2021. 
 Undocumented: How Immigration Became Illegal, Beacon Press, Boston Massachusetts. 2014.  
 A History of the Cuban Revolution, Wiley-Blackwell, New York, NY . Paperback. 224 pages. October 2010. 
Linked Labor Histories: New England, Colombia, and the Making of a Global Working Class.  Duke University Press, Durham, North Carolina.  2008.  
The People Behind Colombian Coal/Bajo el manto del carbon, Aviva Chomsky, Garry Leech, Steve Striffler (Editors), 2007.  
They Take Our Jobs! and 20 Other Myths About Immigration.  Beacon Press, July 2007. Paperback: 236 pages . In English..
West Indian Workers and the United Fruit Company in Costa Rica, 1870–1940. Baton Rouge: Louisiana State University Press, 1996.  
Identity and Struggle at the Margins of the Nation-State: The Laboring People of Central America and the Hispanic Caribbean, (Comparative and International Working-Class History), Aviva Chomsky and Aldo Lauria-Santiago (Editors), 1998. 404 pages. Duke University Press, Durham, North Caroline,
The Cuba Reader: History, Culture, Politics, Aviva Chomsky, Barry Carr, Pamela Maria Smorkaloff (Editors), Duke University Press, Durham, North Caroline, January  2004..

Chapters 
 The Dispossessed: Chronicles of the Desterrados of Colombia, Alfredo Molano, Haymarket Books,, 2005. (Foreword)
 The Profits of Extermination: How U.S. Corporate Power is Destroying Colombia, Francisco Ramírez Cuellar, Common Courage Press,, 2005. (Translation and introduction by Aviva Chomsky)
 Hidden Lives and Human Rights in the United States: Understanding the Controversies and Tragedies of Undocumented Immigration, edited by Lois Ann Lorentzen, Praeger Press, 2014. (Economic Impact of Migrants)
 Beyond Slavery: The Multilayered Legacy of Africans in Latin America and the Caribbean, edited by Darien J. Davis, Rowman & Littlefield,, 2007. (The Logic of Displacement: Afro-Colombians and the War in Colombia)
 Salem: Place, Myth and Memory, edited by Dane Morrison and Nancy Lusignan Schultz, Northeastern University Press,, 2004. (Salem as a Global City: 1850–2004)
 Identity and Struggle at the Margins of the Nation-State: The Laboring Peoples of Central America and the Hispanic Caribbean, edited by Aviva Chomsky and Lauria-Santiago, Duke University Press, 1998. (Introduction and Laborers and Small-Holders in Costa Rica's Mining Communities: 1900–1940)

References

External links

 Facebook page
 Articles
 Faculty profile at Salem State University
 Review of The Costa Rica Reader: History, Culture, Politics. Steven Palmer and Iván Molina, eds. Durham: Duke University Press, Durham North Caroline, November 2004
 Aviva Chomsky's web page at Jacksonville University

21st-century American historians
Salem State University faculty
Historians of colonialism
Historians of Latin America
Jewish American historians
Bates College faculty
Harvard University staff
Aviva
Living people
1957 births
Writers from Boston
American women historians
American people of Belarusian-Jewish descent
American people of Ukrainian-Jewish descent
The Nation (U.S. magazine) people
American women non-fiction writers
21st-century American women